Acronicta heitzmani, or Heitzman's dagger moth, is a moth of the family Noctuidae. The species was first described by Charles V. Covell and Eric H. Metzler in 1992. It is found in Missouri, Arkansas, Illinois and Ohio.

The length of the forewings is 12–14.5 mm for males and 12.5–15 mm for females.

References

External links

"Two New Species of Moths (Noctuidae: Acronictinae, Cuculliinae) From Midland United States".

Acronicta
Moths of North America
Moths described in 1992